National Women's Register (NWR) is an organisation of women's groups in the United Kingdom and Australia. There is a branch of the organisation in Zimbabwe known as Women In Touch (WIT). There are independent members in France, Germany, New Zealand, a and The Republic of Ireland.

History
NWR was founded in 1960. Mary Stott was editor of The Guardian Women's Page and Betty Jerman wrote an article entitled "Squeezed in like sardines in Suburbia", saying that Suburbia was “an incredibly dull place to live and I blame the women.  Their work kept them alert.  Home and child-minding can have a blunting effect on a woman’s mind, but only she can sharpen it."

Maureen Nicol, one such housewife, wrote a letter to the editor in response saying: “Since having my first baby I have been constantly surprised how women seem to go into voluntary exile in the home once they leave their outside work… Perhaps housebound wives with liberal interests and a desire to remain individuals could form a national register so that whenever one moves, one could contact like-minded friends.”

Maureen was inundated with replies to her letter and the Housebound Housewives Register, as it was first called, began. The name was soon changed to National Housewives' Register, and in 1987 to National Women's Register.

In 1995 Maureen Nicol was awarded the OBE in the Queen's Birthday Honours for services to women by founding the organisation.

Group Activities
Members belong to a local group. Local groups usually meet twice a month in each other's homes to discuss pre-arranged topics as well as arranging outings, visits to places of interest and meetings with other groups.

Groups also arrange larger meetings, day conferences and discussion lunches.

The Annual Conference, with themes, workshops and professional speakers is held over three days, usually on a university campus and provides an opportunity for all members to meet.

Support Functions
Some members volunteer to provide services to the organisation by running Book Groups, Correspondence Magazines, and Online discussion groups.

Publications
 A Magazine, The Register, sent twice-yearly to all members.
 A digital newsletter sent to all members, once a month.
 The Annual Report. NWR is a registered Charity so it has to publish certain statutory information annually.

Notes

References

Archives
The archives of the National Women's Register are held at The Women's Library at the Library of the London School of Economics, ref  5NWR

External links
 National Women's Register
 NWR Dronfield

International women's organizations